Alberto Fernando Cardoso (17 October 1906 - deceased), is a former Portuguese footballer who played as a forward.

Cardoso joined Benfica in 1930, where he spent four years, scoring 23 goals in 62 matches, winning two Primeira Liga's and two Campeonatos de Portugal.

Career
Born in Lisbon, Cardoso joined Benfica in 1930, making his debut on 26 October, against Belenenses. In his first year, he won the Campeonato de Portugal with Benfica, but the majority of his matches and goals were in the Campeonato de Lisboa. In his first years, he faced competition from Augusto Dinis and Vítor Silva, so his playing time was reduced and mainly spent in the Campeonato de Lisboa. Later, it was Valadas, Rogério and Carlos Torres, who beat him to the first team, so Cardoso played only sporadically over the course of his eight–years spell at Benfica, racking 23 goals in 62 appearances.

Honours
Benfica
Primeira Divisão: 1935–36, 1937–38
Campeonato de Portugal:1930–31, 1934–35
Campeonato de Lisboa: 1932–33

References
General
 

Specific

1906 births
Footballers from Lisbon
Year of death unknown
Portuguese footballers
Association football forwards
Primeira Liga players
S.L. Benfica footballers